This is a list of episodes of the 2013–2014 Kamen Rider Series Kamen Rider Gaim.

Episodes


{| class="wikitable" width="98%"
|-style="border-bottom:8px solid #FF9F00"
! width="4%" | No. !! Title !! width="10%" | Writer !! width="15%" |Original air date
|-|colspan="5" bgcolor="#e6e9ff"|

Transform! The Orange From the Sky!?

|-|colspan="5" bgcolor="#e6e9ff"|

Deadly! Pineapple Kick!

|-|colspan="5" bgcolor="#e6e9ff"|

Shock! The Rival's Banana Transformation!?

|-|colspan="5" bgcolor="#e6e9ff"|

He's Appeared! The Third Grape Rider!

|-|colspan="5" bgcolor="#e6e9ff"|

Return! The Ichigo Arms of Friendship!

|-|colspan="5" bgcolor="#e6e9ff"|

The Durian Rider Appears!

|-|colspan="5" bgcolor="#e6e9ff"|

Great Ball Watermelon, Big Bang!

|-|colspan="5" bgcolor="#e6e9ff"|

Baron's New Mango Power

|-|colspan="5" bgcolor="#e6e9ff"|

The Great "Inves Monster Capturing" Operation!

|-|colspan="5" bgcolor="#e6e9ff"|

All the Riders Gather! Revealing the Forest's Mystery!

|-|colspan="5" bgcolor="#e6e9ff"|

The Truth Behind the Christmas Game

|-|colspan="5" bgcolor="#e6e9ff"|

The New Generation Rider Appears!

|-|colspan="5" bgcolor="#e6e9ff"|

The Friendship Tag Team of Gaim and Baron!

|-|colspan="5" bgcolor="#e6e9ff"|

The Secret of Helheim's Fruits

|-|colspan="5" bgcolor="#e6e9ff"|

The Man Who Developed the Belts

|-|colspan="5" bgcolor="#e6e9ff"|

A New Arms! Jimber Lemon Is Born!

|-|colspan="5" bgcolor="#e6e9ff"|

The Peach Rider Marika Descends!

|-|colspan="5" bgcolor="#e6e9ff"|

Farewell Beat Riders

|-|colspan="5" bgcolor="#e6e9ff"|

The Gift Secret Weapon

|-|colspan="5" bgcolor="#e6e9ff"|

The End of the World, the Invasion Begins

|-|colspan="5" bgcolor="#e6e9ff"|

Yggdrasill's Secret

|-|colspan="5" bgcolor="#e6e9ff"|

A Seventh of the Truth

|-|colspan="5" bgcolor="#e6e9ff"|

Now Let's Go! Kachidoki Arms!

|-|colspan="5" bgcolor="#e6e9ff"|

Ressha Sentai ToQger vs. Kamen Rider Gaim: Spring Break Combined Special

|-|colspan="5" bgcolor="#e6e9ff"|

The New Formidable Over Lords

|-|colspan="5" bgcolor="#e6e9ff"|

Gridon and Bravo's Strongest Tag Team

|-|colspan="5" bgcolor="#e6e9ff"|

Baron's Genesis Transformation!

|-|colspan="5" bgcolor="#e6e9ff"|

Time to Know the Truth

|-|colspan="5" bgcolor="#e6e9ff"|

The Betrayal of Zangetsu

|-|colspan="5" bgcolor="#e6e9ff"|

The Over Lord King

|-|colspan="5" bgcolor="#e6e9ff"|

The Red and Blue Kikaider

|-|colspan="5" bgcolor="#e6e9ff"|

The Whereabouts of the Forbidden Fruit

|-|colspan="5" bgcolor="#e6e9ff"|

The Strongest Power! Kiwami Arms

|-|colspan="5" bgcolor="#e6e9ff"|

The Great Beat Riders' Gathering!

|-|colspan="5" bgcolor="#e6e9ff"|

The King's Power and the Queen's Revival

|-|colspan="5" bgcolor="#e6e9ff"|

Mitchy's Ark

|-|colspan="5" bgcolor="#e6e9ff"|

A Brotherly Conclusion! Zangetsu vs. Zangetsu Shin!

|-|colspan="5" bgcolor="#e6e9ff"|

Baron Soccer Showdown: Summer Camp!

|-|colspan="5" bgcolor="#e6e9ff"|

Return of the Professor

|-|colspan="5" bgcolor="#e6e9ff"|

The Suicide Plan to Break Into Tower!

|-|colspan="5" bgcolor="#e6e9ff"|

The Over Lord Awakens

|-|colspan="5" bgcolor="#e6e9ff"|

A Duel with the Over Lord King!

|-|colspan="5" bgcolor="#e6e9ff"|

Mitsuzane's Last Transformation!

|-|colspan="5" bgcolor="#e6e9ff"|

Baron's Ultimate Transformation

|-|colspan="5" bgcolor="#e6e9ff"|

The Future Goals of Two People

|-|colspan="5" bgcolor="#e6e9ff"|

The Final Battle of the Two Destined People!

|-|colspan="5" bgcolor="#e6e9ff"|

The Fated Victor

|-|colspan="5" bgcolor="#e6e9ff"|

Transform! And to the Future

|}

References

Gaim
Episodes